Der Messias, K. 572, is Wolfgang Amadeus Mozart's 1789 German-language version of Messiah, George Frideric Handel's 1741 oratorio. On the initiative of Gottfried van Swieten, Mozart adapted Handel's work for performances in Vienna.

The libretto of Mozart's adaptation was largely based on Luther's translation of the Bible. Mozart re-orchestrated about three-fifths of Handel's composition, primarily providing additional parts for an extended section of wind instruments, which was called Harmonie at the time. In general, a half-century after the inception of the work, Mozart adapted an English-language work conceived for a baroque orchestra in a public venue, to accommodate the constraints of private performances and the musical tastes of Vienna.

Mozart's arrangement, first published in 1803, was instrumental in making Messiah Handel's most widely known oratorio. However, the adaptation has had few supporters amongst Mozart or Handel scholars.

History

Mozart first heard Handel's Messiah in London in 1764 or 1765, and then in Mannheim in 1777. The first performance, in English, in Germany was in 1772 in Hamburg. Carl Philipp Emanuel Bach was the first to perform the oratorio in German: he presented it in 1775 in Hamburg, with a libretto translated by Friedrich Gottlieb Klopstock and Christoph Daniel Ebeling, followed by repeat performances in that city in 1777 and 1778. In 1785, Johann Adam Hiller's arrangement of Messiah was performed by 302 vocalists and instrumentalists in Berlin.

The score of Handel's Messiah was first published in London in 1767. In 1789, at the instigation of Gottfried van Swieten, who had founded the music-loving Gesellschaft der Associierten (Society of Associated Cavaliers) to sponsor such concerts, Mozart arranged Handel's work to be performed for invited guests in the houses of Vienna's nobility, as he had arranged Acis and Galethea in 1788 and would, in 1790, arrange the Ode for St. Cecilia's Day (Cäcilienode) and Alexander's Feast (Alexander-Fest). His arrangement Der Messias was first performed on 6 March 1789 at Count Johann Esterházy's palace, with a repeat performance; performed in the residence of Johann Wenzel Paar; and performed twice, around Christmas that year, at the winter palace of Duke Schwarzenberg. Mozart's arrangement was intended for these specific performances, and there was no plan to print it. It was only published after his death.

Text
Handel set his music to a libretto that Charles Jennens had compiled from the King James translation of the Bible (mostly the Old Testament). Jennens commented that: "the Subject excells every other Subject. The Subject is Messiah ...". Messiah differs from Handel's other oratorios in that it does not contain an encompassing narrative, instead offering contemplation on different aspects of the Christian Messiah.

The libretto follows the liturgical year: Part I corresponding to Advent, Christmas, and the life of Jesus; Part II to Lent, Easter, the Ascension, and Pentecost; and Part III to the end of the church year—dealing with the end of time. The birth and death of Jesus are told in the words of the prophet Isaiah, the most prominent source of the libretto. The only true "scene" of the oratorio is the Annunciation to the shepherds which is taken from the Gospel of Luke. The imagery of shepherd and lamb features prominently in many movements.

Mozart set his arrangement to a German translation that Klopstock and Ebeling had written for Carl Philipp Emanuel Bach's version in Hamburg. The German text stays close to the Luther Bible translation.

Music
For the music, Handel used the same devices as in his operas and other oratorios: choral and solo singing. The solos are typically a combination of recitative and aria. His orchestra is small: oboes; strings; and basso continuo of harpsichord, violoncello, violone, and bassoon. Two trumpets and timpani highlight selected movements, such as the Hallelujah chorus. Handel uses four voice parts: soprano, alto, tenor and bass in the solo and choral movements. Handel uses both polyphonic and homophonic settings to illustrate the text. He often stresses a word by extended coloraturas, especially in several movements that are parodies of music composed earlier on Italian texts. He uses a cantus firmus, on long repeated notes especially, to illustrate God's majesty when he speaks. Even polyphonic movements typically end on a dramatic long musical rest, followed by a broad homophonic conclusion.

Mozart used the symphonic orchestra of his time, and used wind instruments (Harmonie), often to add a specific color to a movement. As in his Great Mass in C minor, Mozart assigned two soprano soloists, instead of Handel's soprano and alto; sometimes assigned choral parts to the soloists; and changed the vocal range for some recitatives and arias. He also shortened the music by cutting out a few numbers and shortening single movements: for example, using only the first section of a da capo aria. At Van Swieten's request, he wrote a new recitative.

Mozart introduced the clarinet, and he used the wind instruments to establish a mood. In choral movements, he assigned a wind instrument to play colla parte with the soprano, and a choir of three trombones to reinforce alto, tenor, and bass. The trumpet became an instrument among others, and no longer a symbol of secular or divine authority, possibly because the art of playing it had deteriorated. Mozart assigned the horn to play in the aria "Sie schallt, die Posaun ("The trumpet shall sound"), which Handel had set for trumpet. Mozart used a harpsichord as a continuo instrument.

Structure

Mozart used Italian terminology, for example Overtura for the overture, Recitativo for secco recitatives (i.e. accompanied exclusively by thorough bass), recitativo accompagnato ed aria for an accompanied recitative followed by an aria (treated as one movement and the standard for solo movements), and Coro for choral movements. Only once is the chorus divided in an upper chorus and a lower chorus; it is four-part otherwise.

Reception
Mozart's version of Handel's Messiah was first published in 1803, edited by Johann Adam Hiller. It was instrumental in making Messiah Handel's most widely known oratorio. In 1884, Robert Franz published a mixed German-and-English version of Messiah, based on Handel's original, Mozart's arrangement, and his own amendments. He tried to purge the score of Hiller's "unallowable" additions, in which he was helped by having access to Hiller's manuscript. However, few scholars of either Mozart or Handel's music have been supporters of Franz's version.

Recordings

Notes

References

Sources
 
 Bärenreiter Edition, edited by Andreas Holschneider, published in 1989, 13th edition 2016

External links

 F. G. Händel's Oratorium der Messias nach W. A. Mozart's Bearbeitung. Partitur. (paroles de C. Denner traduites par C. D. Ebeling.) Breitkopf & Härtel 1803
 

1789 compositions
Arrangements of classical compositions
Classical period compositions
German-language oratorios
Messiah (Handel)